Ben Sisario is an American academic, author, and journalist.

Career
He is a staff reporter for The New York Times, covering music and culture. Sisario is also the author of Doolittle (2006) a non-fiction book in the 33⅓ series about the studio album Doolittle (1989) by the Pixies, an alternative-rock band.

Sisario is a contributor to Blender, New York, Rolling Stone, Spin, New York City public-radio station WFUV and The Village Voice'''s annual Pazz & Jop music critics' poll.

He is a member of the teaching faculty at the Tisch School of the Arts at New York University, instructing courses on Rock Music in Historical Context and Writing for Popular Music.

See also

 List of American journalists
 Lists of American writers
 List of New York University people
 List of non-fiction writers
 List of The New York Times employees

References

Bibliography
 Sisario, Ben (2006).  Doolittle.  New York City:  Continuum Publishing. .

External links
 Crimes Against Music Sisario's blog Crimes Against Music Sisario interview with The Uberlist''
 

Year of birth missing (living people)
Place of birth missing (living people)
20th-century American writers
21st-century American non-fiction writers
American music journalists
Living people
The New York Times writers
Tisch School of the Arts faculty
Radio personalities from New York City
Writers from New York City
WFUV people